Hocine Aït Ahmed (‎; 20 August 1926 – 23 December 2015) was an Algerian politician. He was founder and leader until 2009 of the historical political opposition in Algeria.

Life
Aït Ahmed was born at Aït Yahia in 1926. 

He one of the main leaders of the National Liberation Front (FLN) in the Algerian War, and was arrested along with Ahmed Ben Bella, Mohamed Boudiaf, and Mohamed Khider after France hijacked the airplane the FLN leaders bound for Tunisia, and directed it to occupied Algiers.

After the Algerian War, Aït Ahmed resigned from the Provisional Government of the Algerian Republic (GPRA) and all the organs of the new power during the crisis of the summer of 1962. In September 1963, he founded the Socialist Forces Front (FFS), which sought political pluralism in political life locked by the single party system.

Arrested and sentenced to death in 1964, he escaped from the El Harrach prison on May 1, 1966. Exiled in Switzerland, he became a doctor of law. After the riots of 1988, the Algerian president Chadli Ben Djedid proposed a new constitution calling for political pluralism. Aït Ahmed was invited to return to his country, where he came back in December 1989, at the head of the FFS, but again left his country after the assassination of the President, Mohamed Boudiaf, in June 1992. He repeatedly returned to Algeria since then, including during the 50th anniversary of the outbreak of the war of liberation (November 1, 1954). Aït Ahmed died at the age of 89 in Lausanne, Switzerland on 23 December 2015.

References

External links

1926 births
2015 deaths
Algerian Berber politicians
People from Aït Yahia
Kabyle people
Algerian People's Party politicians
Members of the National Liberation Front (Algeria)
Socialist Forces Front politicians
Algerian democracy activists
Algerian dissidents
Algerian emigrants to Switzerland